Wanna Party / World's Mine is a 2014 EP by Future Brown, released on Warp Records.

Track listing

Personnel
 Fatima Al Qadiri - producer, writer
 Asma Maroof - producer, writer
 Daniel Pineda - producer, writer
 Jamie Imanian-Friedman - producer, writer
 Tink – vocals, rap, performer
 3D Na'Tee – vocals, rap, performer
 Prince Rapid – vocals, rap, performer
 Dirty Danger – vocals, rap, performer
 Roachee – vocals, rap, performer
 Future Brown - producer
 MikeQ -  producer
 Dis – design
 D.V. Caputo - design
 Jeremy Cox - Mixing Engineer
 Dave Kutch  – mastering

References

2014 debut EPs
Future Brown albums